This is a list of lighthouses in the Balearic Islands. The Spanish archipelago lies at the western end of the Mediterranean Sea.

Lighthouses

See also 

 List of lighthouses in Spain
 List of lighthouses in the Canary Islands

References

External links 
 

Lists of lighthouses in Spain
Lighthouses